The 1897–98 Football Tournament was the 9th staging of The Football Tournament.

This tournament rescued the old format of the first edition where in case of a tie, extra-time was played, and if the match was still level, then the match would be replayed until a winner emerged.

Overview
It was contested by 6 teams, and Christianshavns BK managed to play only one match in the tournament, which was a 0-14 loss to Akademisk Boldklub, before the club was disbanded on 29 November 1897. The team's remaining matches are included in the standings as victories for opponents with the figures 0-0. Kjøbenhavns Boldklub won the championship for the third time in their history after beating AB in the decisive match to win the title, 2–0 after extra-time.

League standings

References

External links
RSSSF

1897–98 in Danish football
Top level Danish football league seasons
The Football Tournament seasons
Denmark